Kila Iaravai is a Papua New Guinean football player. Currently a member of Hekari United in the Papua New Guinea National Soccer League. He has made 2 appearances for the Papua New Guinea national football team.

References

Living people
1991 births
Papua New Guinean footballers
Papua New Guinea international footballers
Hekari United players
Association football defenders
2012 OFC Nations Cup players